The 2013 season is the 103rd season of competitive football in Paraguay.

Primera División

Transfers

 List of transfers during the 2013 season registered under the Asociación Paraguaya de Fútbol.

National team

Friendly matches

2014 FIFA World Cup qualification

References
 Paraguay: Fixtures and Results

External links
 Diario ABC Color
 Asociación Paraguaya de Fútbol

 
Seasons in Paraguayan football